Re:Zero − Starting Life in Another World is an anime adaptation of a light novel series written by Tappei Nagatsuki and illustrated by Shinichirou Otsuka. The 25-episode series aired from April 4, 2016 to September 19, 2016, with an extended 50-minute first episode. It was broadcast on TV Tokyo. The series was simulcast by Crunchyroll. The first opening theme song was "Redo" by Konomi Suzuki, and the first ending theme was "STYX HELIX"  and for episode 7 was "STRAIGHT BET", both sung by MYTH&ROID. The second opening theme song, titled "Paradisus-Paradoxum", is performed by MYTH&ROID, while the second ending theme song, titled "Stay Alive", is performed by Rie Takahashi; for episode 14 it was "theater D", sung by MYTH&ROID.

In January 2020 a "Director's Cut" of the first season was released. The original twenty-five episode season was reworked into thirteen extended 50-minute episodes for the cut, which included some altered scenes and additional footage.



Episode list

Home video

Notes

References

External links
  
 

2016 Japanese television seasons
Re:Zero - Starting Life in Another World episode lists